Corografia brasílica, ou relação histórico-geográfica do reino do Brasil  (Brazilian Chorography, or Historical-Geographical Relation of the Kingdom of Brazil) by Manuel Aires de Casal was the first book published in Brazil. This book contains the first published edition of Pero Vaz de Caminha's letter.

1817 non-fiction books
Brazilian non-fiction books
History books about Brazil